The Network Access License (NAL) is mandatory for telecommunication equipment that is exported to or sold in China. This license applies to telecommunication equipment that is connected to the public telecommunication network.
For receiving the Network Access License, an application has to be submitted at the Ministry of Industry and Information Technology (MIIT) in Beijing. Among others, the Ministry of Industry and Information Technology is responsible for the Chinese regulation and development of the Internet, wireless, broadcasting, communications and production of electronic and information goods, and the promotion of the national knowledge economy.

History
In 2001, the Chinese authorities published the first three product categories requiring NAL. Since then, about 25 product categories including about 300 different kinds of telecommunication devices have been added to the product catalogue. Furthermore, the NAL products are categorized in basic and high-end equipment.
In August 2014, the Ministry of Industry and Information Technology has issued 495 network access licenses for telecom equipment. 
In 2014, there are only 14 test laboratories that are authorized for the testing of the telecommunication equipment. Most of these test laboratories are specialized on product categories.

Application process
The application process is a 4-step process and include:
 Submission of application documents
 Product tests
 Factory inspection
 License issue

The length of time required to obtain an NAL varies according to the product for which the license is sought. Based on current regulations, it usually takes 20 days for testing and 60 days for processing an application. Nevertheless, for some products it may take longer.

See also
Ministry of Industry and Information Technology of the People's Republic of China MIIT
Standardization Administration of China SAC
Electronic information industry in China
Ministries of China

References

Certification marks
Export and import control
Economy of China
Safety codes
Foreign trade of China
Organizations based in Beijing